Beklemeto Pass, also known as Troyan Pass, is a mountain pass in the Balkan Mountains (Stara Planina) in Bulgaria. It connects Troyan and Karnare on the Karlovo Plain.

The pass is in north-central Bulgaria 20 km from the town of Troyan. The pass features a ski resort.

The pass is on one of the main roads connecting northern and southern Bulgaria. This was the Roman Via Trayana (Trajan road), and some of the Roman remains can still be seen. North of the pass was the fortress of Ad Radices, south of it was Sub Radices, and at the pass was the crest station of Montemno (Monte Haemo), the foundation of which is still visible.

Close to the pass there is a monument dedicated to the liberation struggle of the Bulgarians on the peak of Goraltepe, a 15-minute hike to the east of the pass. It is accessible via a narrow paved road.

References

Basic information and photos
Photo of ski resort
Description of pass and monument
Paragliding on the Beklemeto Pass

Mountain passes of Bulgaria
Balkan mountains
Landforms of Lovech Province